Origin of Symmetry is the second studio album by English rock band Muse, released on 18 June 2001 through Taste Media. It was produced by John Leckie, who produced Muse's debut album Showbiz (1999), and David Bottrill.

Origin of Symmetry reached number three on the UK Albums Chart and was certified platinum. Four singles were released: "Plug In Baby", "New Born", "Bliss", and "Hyper Music" / "Feeling Good". As of 2018, Origin of Symmetry had sold more than two million copies worldwide. Since its release, Origin of Symmetry has featured in several professional lists ranking the best albums from the 2000s as well as all time. For the album's 20th anniversary in 2021, Muse released a remixed and remastered version, Origin of Symmetry: XX Anniversary RemiXX.

Writing
Origin of Symmetry has been described as alternative rock, progressive rock, hard rock, and space rock. Muse developed it during their tour for their debut album, Showbiz. "Feeling Good", a cover, was written for Broadway by Anthony Newley and Leslie Bricusse in 1964, and first recorded by Nina Simone for her 1965 album I Put a Spell on You.

The album title derives from the 1994 book Hyperspace by the theoretical physicist Michio Kaku, which suggests the title The Origin of Symmetry for a future book about the discovery of supersymmetry, a reference to On the Origin of Species. According to the Muse songwriter, Matt Bellamy: "Everyone's been writing about the origin of life so now they'll start looking at the origin of symmetry; there's a certain amount of stability in the universe and to find out where it originates from would be to find out if God exists." Whereas the Showbiz lyrics had "wallowed in heartbroken angst", Bellamy's lyrics moved to "sci-fi surrealism".

Recording
After completing the Showbiz tour, Muse recorded "Plug In Baby", "Bliss", "New Born" and "Darkshines" with the producer David Bottrill, forming the "backbone" of Origin of Symmetry.  To capture their live energy, Muse recorded together as a band, with some overdubs. 

After Bottrill departed to work on the Tool album Lateralus, Muse enlisted John Leckie, who had produced Showbiz. They recorded in Sawmills in Fowey, Cornwall; Ridge Farm Studio in Surrey; Real World Studios in Box, Wiltshire; and David Gilmour's Astoria houseboat studio on the Thames. While they were working in Real World Studios, they went to a church in Bath to record a church organ for "Megalomania".

Having mainly recorded Showbiz with a Gibson Les Paul guitar, Bellamy recorded Origin of Symmetry using a custom Manson guitar equipped with a built-in Fuzz Factory, a fuzz distortion effect. It was the first of many collaborations between Bellamy and Manson, and Bellamy purchased a majority share of Manson in 2019. Bellamy used the Fuzz Factory effect on many of the riffs on the album.

The band experimented with new instruments and dynamics. Dominic Howard expanded the standard rock drum kit with items including a balaphone and animal bones on "Screenager".

Release
Origin of Symmetry was released on 18 June 2001. It was originally scheduled for release in the United States through Maverick Records, who had also released Showbiz. However, Muse left Maverick when Maverick demanded Bellamy rerecord the album with less falsetto. The album was not released in the US until 2005.

Origin of Symmetry was remastered and reissued as part of the Origin of Muse boxset, alongside Showbiz, demos, live performances and other material. The box set was released on 6 December 2019.

The Japanese edition of the album features the bonus track "Futurism" which is placed before "Megalomania". This track is also tagged onto the end of the tracklisting on digital editions.

Origin of Symmetry: XX Anniversary RemiXX
On 18 June 2021, the album's 20th anniversary, Muse released a remixed and remastered version, Origin of Symmetry: XX Anniversary RemiXX. A collaboration with the producer Rich Costey, who worked on several later Muse albums, it features a "more open, dynamic and less crushed sound". The new mixes also restores elements that were originally muted or obscured, such as string sections on "Space Dementia", "Citizen Erased" and "Megalomania", and a harpsichord on "Micro Cuts". The album features new cover artwork by Sujin Kim. The Pitchfork critic Jazz Monroe described the reissue as "definitive ... even more colossal and timeless".

Critical reception

Origin of Symmetry received mainly positive reviews. Roy Wilkinson of Q praised it as an "astonishing record... where extra-terrestrial fascinations meet the classical world's more unhinged impulses", adding that "comparisons with Radiohead that dogged Muse's early career now seem all but obsolete". Roger Morton of NME called the album a "reinvention of grunge as a neo-classical, high gothic future rock, full of flambéed pianolas and white-knuckle electric camp ... It's apparent that Muse can handle their brutal arias." Q named Origin of Symmetry one of the best 50 albums of 2001, while Kerrang! named it the ninth-best.

The Guardians Betty Clarke panned Origin of Symmetry as "unbelievably overblown, self-important and horrible". The Stylus critic Tyler Martin felt that Muse were "very good at their craft", but that "the constant overplaying of everything waters it all down immensely".

Legacy 
Origin of Symmetry has made appearances on lists of the greatest rock albums of the 2000s, both poll-based and on publication lists. In 2006, Q named it the 74th-greatest album of all time, and in 2008 Q readers voted it the 28th-best British album. Kerrang! named it the 20th Best British rock album and the 13th best album of the 21st century. According to the review aggregator website Acclaimed Music, Origin of Symmetry is the 1,247th-best-reviewed album of all time.

In a retrospective review, Natalie Shaw of BBC Music wrote that Origin of Symmetry "shows a band with the drive and unfettered ambition to create a standalone marvel which not only awakens the ghosts and clichés from prog's pompous past, but entirely adds its own voice". He said that many elements of the band's later albums, such as Black Holes and Revelations (2006), could be traced back to the album. The author Amy Britton argued that on Origin of Symmetry Bellamy "progressed [his band]'s sound so much that he earned a new title – this generation's guitar hero," highlighting "Plug In Baby" and "New Born". In a retrospective review in 2021, the Pitchfork critic Jazz Monroe wrote: "Muse were playing melodrama as teenage realism, an extremely, ridiculously honest noise ... By combining goth vulnerability with sci-fi scale and hard-rock drama, [Origin of Symmetry] captures a paradox of young romance: on one hand, Bellamy sounds wracked with despair, but he proclaims his heartbreak with the glee of an ecstatic preacher."

On 26 and 28 August 2011, Muse performed a special set at the Reading and Leeds Festivals, which consisted of the band playing Origin of Symmetry from start to finish, to commemorate the 10th anniversary of the album.

Track listing

Most streaming services place “Feeling Good” as the eighth track, between “Micro Cuts” and “Screenager”, and include "Futurism" as the 12th track. The Japanese edition features “Futurism” as the 11th track and “Megalomania” as the 12th.

Personnel

Muse
Matthew Bellamy – lead vocals, lead and rhythm guitars, piano, keyboards, Wurlitzer piano and megaphone on "Feeling Good", pipe organ on "Megalomania", string arrangement, production, mixing
Christopher Wolstenholme – bass guitar, backing vocals, double bass on "Feeling Good", vibraphone, production, mixing
Dominic Howard – drums, percussion, production, mixing.

Guest musicians
Jacqueline Norrie – violin
Sara Herbert – violin
Clare Finnimore – viola
Caroline Lavelle – cello

Additional personnel
David Bottrill – production and engineering on "New Born", "Bliss", "Plug In Baby" and "Darkshines"
John Leckie – production and engineering on tracks "Space Dementia", "Hyper Music", "Citizen Erased", "Micro Cuts", "Screenager", "Feeling Good" and "Megalomania"
Ric Peet – engineering on tracks "Space Dementia", "Hyper Music", "Citizen Erased", "Micro Cuts", "Screenager", "Feeling Good" and "Megalomania"
Steve Cooper – additional engineering on "New Born", "Bliss", "Plug In Baby" and "Darkshines"
Chris Brown – additional engineering and programming on tracks "Space Dementia", "Hyper Music", "Citizen Erased", "Micro Cuts", "Screenager", "Feeling Good" and "Megalomania"
Mark Thomas – assistant engineering on tracks "Bliss", "Hyper Music", "Plug In Baby" and "Micro Cuts"
Claire Lewis – assistant engineering on tracks "Space Dementia", "Hyper Music", "Citizen Erased", "Micro Cuts", "Screenager", "Feeling Good" and "Megalomania"
Damon Iddins – assistant engineering
Mirek Styles – assistant engineering
John Cornfield – mixing
Ray Staff – mastering
William Eagar – artwork

Charts and certifications

Weekly charts

Year-end charts

Certifications

Notes and references
Notes

References

External links
 Muse official site

2001 albums
Muse (band) albums
Albums produced by John Leckie
Albums produced by David Bottrill